Pier Paolo Bianchi (born 11 March 1952) is an Italian former Grand Prix motorcycle road racing World Champion.

He won consecutive FIM 125 cc world championships in 1976 and 1977. He won one more 125 championship in 1980 on a MBA.

Complete Grand Prix motorcycle racing results 

Points system from 1969 to 1987:

Points system from 1988 to 1992:

(key) (Races in bold indicate pole position; races in italics indicate fastest lap)

References 

Italian motorcycle racers
50cc World Championship riders
125cc World Championship riders
1952 births
Living people
80cc World Championship riders
125cc World Riders' Champions